A stock model is a person being photographed for one or more pictures in different poses, clothing, places, with or without props. For various advertisements, and media projects including photo manipulations. For a business or project, stock model photos are cheaper and more practical to use than hiring a model and a photographer.

A stock model can be of any size, height, gender, or ethnicity, depending upon what the stock photographer is looking to capture. Examples include a woman walking her dog, a man going to work, and a grandmother baking cookies.

Stock modeling photos can be bought and sold through many sites that sells stock photos. In recent years stock modeling is at an all-time high due in part of media projects on the internet for businesses, home, work, school and leisure. Professions such as various types of artist and business advertisements benefit from the use of stock models. A vast number of artist and photographers use their own collection of stock models for their projects.

Modeling (profession)
Stock photography